Hello Kitty is a fictional character produced by the Japanese company Sanrio. 

Hello Kitty may also refer to:

Animations
The Adventures of Hello Kitty & Friends, a 3D CGI animated series
Hello Kitty's Furry Tale Theater, an animated series based on the popular Japanese character, Hello Kitty

Games
Hello Kitty Online, online role playing game 
Hello Kitty: Roller Rescue,  an action-adventure video game 
Hello Kitty no Hanabatake, children's platform game
Hello Kitty: Big City Dreams, Hello Kitty game for the Nintendo DS
Hello Kitty's Cube Frenzy, puzzle game featuring Hello Kitty for the PlayStation, Game Boy Color gaming systems

Music
"Hello Kitty" (song), a 2014 song by Avril Lavigne
"Hello Kitty", a 2018 single by Slayyyter
"Hello Kitty", a 1992 single by Hum
"Hello Kitty", a song by Critters Buggin from Monkeypot Merganzer (1997)
"Shout (Hello Kitty)", a version of Devo's "Shout" from their E-Z Listening Disc (1987)

Other
Hello Kitty murder, a 1999 kidnapping and murder of a woman in Hong Kong, in which the victim's body was stuffed into Hello Kitty dolls
Kitty (disambiguation)